The year 1997 in architecture involved some significant architectural events and new buildings.

Events
 September 26 – An earthquake strikes the Italian regions of Umbria and Marche, causing part of the Basilica of St. Francis at Assisi (constructed 1228–1253) to collapse.

Buildings and structures

Buildings

 American Air Museum at the Imperial War Museum Duxford, England, designed by Foster and Partners, is officially opened (Stirling Prize 1998).
 British Library in London, designed by Colin St John Wilson, opens.
 Clyde Auditorium in Glasgow, designed by Foster and Partners, is completed.
 Commerzbank Tower in Frankfurt, designed by Norman Foster, is completed and becomes the tallest building in the European Union (1997–2012).
 The Sky Tower (Auckland) in New Zealand, the tallest free-standing structure in the Southern Hemisphere at 328 m (1,076 ft), designed by Craig Craig Moller Ltd, opens on March 3.
 The T & C Tower in Kaohsiung, Taiwan, designed by C. Y. Lee & Partners and HOK, is completed.
 Getty Center in Los Angeles, designed by Richard Meier.
 Shakespeare's Globe in London, a reconstruction of the Elizabethan Globe Theatre, is officially opened.
 Guggenheim Museum Bilbao, designed by Frank Gehry, opens to the public.
 Petronas Twin Towers in Kuala Lumpur, designed by César Pelli, are completed, constituting the world's tallest building until 2003.
 Fondation Beyeler in Riehen near Basel, Switzerland, designed by Renzo Piano, is opened.
 Kunsthaus Bregenz in Austria, designed by Peter Zumthor, is opened.
 Katuaq cultural centre, Nuuk, Greenland, designed by Schmidt Hammer Lassen Architects, opens on February 15.
 Nubian Museum in Aswan, inaugurated (Aga Khan Award for Architecture 2001)
 Crown Casino in Melbourne, Australia is completed.
 WoZoCo housing in Amsterdam, designed by Jacob and Nathalie de Vries and Winy Maas of MVRDV, is completed.
 Rudin House, Leymen, France, designed by Herzog & de Meuron, is completed.
 Rongomaraeroa, Museum of New Zealand Te Papa Tongarewa, Wellington, designed by Cliff Whiting, is opened.
 Station F at Abbey Mills Pumping Station in London, designed by Allies and Morrison, is completed.
 Refurbishment following 1992 Windsor Castle fire in England, designed by Giles Downes, is completed.

Awards
 AIA Gold Medal – Richard Meier.
 Architecture Firm Award – R.M. Kliment & Frances Halsband Architects.
 Praemium Imperiale Architecture Laureate – Richard Meier.
 Pritzker Prize – Sverre Fehn.
 Prix de l'Académie d'Architecture de France – Imre Makovecz.
 Prix de l'Équerre d'Argent – Jean-Marc Ibos and Myrto Vitart.
 RAIA Gold Medal – Roy Simpson.
 RIBA Royal Gold Medal – Tadao Ando.
 Stirling Prize – Michael Wilford, Stuttgart Music School.
 Thomas Jefferson Medal in Architecture – Jaime Lerner.
 Twenty-five Year Award – Phillips Exeter Academy Library

Births

Deaths
 May 22 – Alziro Bergonzo, Italian architect and painter (born 1906)
 August 8 – Paul Rudolph (born 1918)
 September 4 – Aldo Rossi (born 1931)

References

 
20th-century architecture